The inferior ulnar collateral artery (anastomotica magna artery) is an artery in the arm. It arises about 5 cm. above the elbow from the brachial artery.

Course
It passes medialward upon the Brachialis, and piercing the medial intermuscular septum, winds around the back of the humerus between the Triceps brachii and the bone, forming, by its junction with the profunda brachii, an arch above the olecranon fossa.

Branches and anastomoses
As the vessel lies on the brachialis, it gives off branches which ascend to join the superior ulnar collateral: others descend in front of the medial epicondyle, to anastomose with the anterior ulnar recurrent.

Behind the medial epicondyle a branch anastomoses with the superior ulnar collateral and posterior ulnar recurrent arteries.

Additional images

References

External links
 

Arteries of the upper limb